North Hodge is a village in Jackson Parish, Louisiana, United States. The population was 388 at the 2010 census, down from 436 at the 2000 census. It is part of the Ruston Micropolitan Statistical Area.

Geography
North Hodge is located in southwestern Jackson Parish at  (32.282052, -92.718443). It is bordered to the southwest by Hodge and to the south by East Hodge. U.S. Route 167 passes through the village, leading north  to Quitman and south through Hodge  to Jonesboro, the parish seat.

Demographics

As of the census of 2000, there were 436 people, 172 households, and 116 families residing in the village. The racial makeup of the village was 80.50% White, 17.89% African American, 0.69% Native American, 0.69% Asian, and 0.23% from two or more races. Hispanic or Latino of any race were 0.23% of the population.

There were 172 households, out of which 36.6% had children under the age of 18 living with them, 51.7% were married couples living together, 13.4% had a female householder with no husband present, and 32.0% were non-families. 26.2% of all households were made up of individuals, and 12.8% had someone living alone who was 65 years of age or older. The average household size was 2.53 and the average family size was 3.09.

In the village, the population was spread out, with 28.2% under the age of 18, 11.7% from 18 to 24, 27.5% from 25 to 44, 19.3% from 45 to 64, and 13.3% who were 65 years of age or older. The median age was 34 years. For every 100 females, there were 97.3 males. For every 100 females age 18 and over, there were 84.1 males.

The median income for a household in the village was $21,563, and the median income for a family was $27,083. Males had a median income of $28,625 versus $13,000 for females. The per capita income for the village was $10,934. About 26.3% of families and 28.5% of the population were below the poverty line, including 37.0% of those under age 18 and 16.1% of those age 65 or over.

Current government
North Hodge is governed under provisions of the Lawrason Act.

The current mayor serving since 2015 is Kathy Robertson. Council members are Chasity Womack (since 2015), Ernest "Ernie" Roden, & Andrea Woods, since 2019. The chief of police is Robert "Bobby" Dillon.

References

Village's official facebook page: https://www.facebook.com/VillageofNH/

Villages in Louisiana
Villages in Jackson Parish, Louisiana
Villages in Ruston, Louisiana micropolitan area